One Spy Too Many starring Robert Vaughn and David McCallum is the 1966 feature-length film version of The Man from U.N.C.L.E.s two-part season two premiere "Alexander the Greater Affair".  It is the third such feature film that used as its basis a reedited version of one or more episodes from the series.  In this instance, the film took the two-part episode and added in a subplot featuring Yvonne Craig as an U.N.C.L.E. operative carrying on a flirtatious relationship with Napoleon Solo (Robert Vaughn); Craig does not appear in the television episodes. Both episodes were written by Dean Hargrove and directed by Joseph Sargent.

It also added in and substituted scenes that, while not out of place in a 1960s U.S. spy film, were more explicitly sexual than generally shown on U.S. television at the time.  Whereas the earlier U.N.C.L.E. films added material to a single episode to create a feature-length movie, "One Spy Too Many" removed certain elements of the two-part episode (e.g., scenes with Alexander's parents) to allow for the added subplot with Craig and other enhanced scenes within the film's overall running time.  This was the last film culled from the series to be theatrically released in the U.S. (in late 1966).

Plot
The film opens with Alexander (Rip Torn) stealing a chemical weapon from a military base.  The weapon causes an enemy's troops to lose the will to fight, thereby making conquest in battle far easier.  This is part of Alexander's dual goal:  to conquer the world in the manner of Alexander the Great and to break each of the major moral codes in so doing (which essentially means the ten commandments as detailed throughout the movie).

U.N.C.L.E. becomes involved after the theft of the weapon and agents Napoleon Solo (Vaughn) and Illya Kuryakin (McCallum) are assigned.  Also searching for Alexander is his estranged wife Tracey (Dorothy Provine), although her motive is to serve him with divorce papers. Through a series of coincidences (and Tracey's focused efforts to trail the U.N.C.L.E agents to find her husband), Solo, Kuryakin, and Tracey end up joining forces.  As a result, they are at various times captured, tortured, left to die in an elaborate way in an Egyptian tomb, and otherwise thwarted by Alexander throughout the film.

Alexander believes that if he is able to assist a military junta in the takeover of a small country (implied to be Vietnam) that he can use that country as a base for world conquest.  By careful planning, he combines his final violation of a commandment - killing the country's leader - with the takeover of the country and the start of his march toward global domination.  Intervention by U.N.C.L.E. prevents the assassination, and during his escape Alexander is killed by his own accomplice Kavon (David Opatoshu).

Cast
Robert Vaughn as Napoleon Solo
David McCallum as Illya Kuryakin
Rip Torn as Alexander
Dorothy Provine as Tracey Alexander 
Leo G. Carroll as Alexander Waverly
Yvonne Craig as Maude Waverly
David Opatoshu as Mr. Kavon
David Sheiner as Parviz
James Hong as Prince Phanong
Donna Michelle as Princess Nicole
Cal Bolder as Ingo Lindstrum

See also
List of American films of 1966

References

External links

 New York Times Review from 1966
 Part 1/2
 Part 2/2

1966 films
Parody films based on James Bond films
Films directed by Joseph Sargent
1960s action films
1960s spy films
Metro-Goldwyn-Mayer films
Films scored by Gerald Fried
Films edited from television programs
The Man from U.N.C.L.E.
1960s English-language films